The Chopin Alveograph is a tool for flour quality measurement. It measures the flexibility of the dough produced from the flour, by inflating a bubble in a thin sheet of the dough until it bursts.  The resulting values show the strength of the flour, and thus its suitability for different uses.

It was developed in 1920 in France by Marcel Chopin, who named it the Extensimeter.

History 
Developed in the late 1920s in France by Marcel Chopin, the Chopin Alveograph is used in bakery worldwide. The alveographic test enables to measure the tenacity (resilience), the extensibility, and elasticity of a dough (standardized mix of flour and water). This measurement of the strength of flours is considered as a good index of the baking quality of baking flours.

In France, it has been used in regulations since at least 1963 as a criterion in milling for the composition of flours destined to the "french" type bread-baking.

Agronomist Norman Borlaug (Nobel Prize in 1970) used this invention to select varieties of wheat for tropical environments.

Description 
The Chopin alveograph is composed of two inseparable elements: 
 a kneading-machine equipped of an extraction passage which enables the development of the dough and the extraction of it for the preparation of the dough pieces in order to realise the alveographic test.
 the alveograph in itself which measures the three-dimensional extension of the piece of dough, which is deformed like a bubble. That extension mode reproduces the deformation of the dough under the influence of the pushing of gas.  
Still used nowadays, the Chopin alveograph is manufactured by Chopin Technologies, subsidiary of the KPM Analytics company.

Usage Protocol

Calibration 
1. Press the button 60/92

2. Place the calibrator and tighten the lock screw.

3. Open the valve to the maximum

4. Launch the air by pressing button 92/60

5. Adjust the high pression on 92 with the arrow, then press ok

6. Adjust the low pression on 60 with the valve

Experience 
1. Press on the green graph

2. Select the little note at top right to settle parameters

3. Pour 250g of the sample

4. Fill the burette with salt solution (2.5%) function of the flour humidity

5. Start the chronometer by pressing the green button

6. Open to the maximum the burette overhead the hole of the tank

7. At the end of the two first periods, stop the arm at the bottom of the tank by pressing the red button and scrape off the flour

8. At 8 min, press on the arrow

9. Remove the first centimeter of the emerging dough

10. When the dough arrives at the level of the notches, cut the dough and flatten it with the rolling mill.

11. Re-oil the tray between every dough pieces

12. Cut a circle with the die-cutter and place in the oven

13. At the last dough, press the red button first and the arrow

14. Clean the tank

15. At 28 min, press a long time on the 1 to reset the chronometer

16. Center the dough, place the two covers, tighten the lock screw and remove the two covers

17. Press the red/green button then press again when the bubble  bursts.

Bibliography 
 Chopin, Marcel, Cinquante années de recherches relatives aux blés et à leur utilisation industrielle, Boulogne, 1973.

References

External links
Chopin Alveograph videos
Chopin Alveograph manufacturer's leaflet
Chopin Alveograph Guide from AHDB
Alvéographe, par Nancy Edwards et Jim Dexter (in French) Last Modification: 2008-12-04

Flour
French inventions
Breads
Baked goods
Science and technology in France